is a Japanese manga artist from Hyōgo Prefecture, known for his work as the illustrator of Mobile Suit Gundam Wing: Episode Zero, specializes in the yaoi genre.

Leroy Dessaroux described Kanbe as being "unusually good at figure drawing", especially drawing people during sex acts. Active Anime's Rachel Bentham commends Hot Limit'''s art as "racy, sexy and hot", and has praised Kanbe's skill at drawing "subtle facial expressions".

 Bibliography 

 Tsuki no Umareru Yoru (1995) - Author & Illustrator
 Mobile Suit Gundam Wing: Episode Zero (1997) - Illustrator
 Kimi Made Mousugu (2000) - Author & Illustrator
 Moichido Koishite (2001) - Author & Illustrator
 Hitomi no Mukougawa (2001) - Author & Illustrator
 Yasashiku Sokubaku Shiteageru (2002) - Author & Illustrator
 Keep Out (2002) - Author & Illustrator
 Cool Down (2003) - Author & Illustrator
 Scramble Game (2004) - Author & Illustrator
 Trouble Love Candy (2004) - Author & Illustrator
 Freezing Flame (Kooru Shakunetsu) (2004) - Author & Illustrator
 Bittersweet Café (2005) - Author & Illustrator
 Love or Pride (2006) - Author & Illustrator
 Hot Limit (2006) - Illustrator
 Loving Gaze - (2006) - Author & Illustrator
 Love Wars (2007) - Illustrator
 Blind Love (2007) - Author & Illustrator
 I.D (2008) - Author & Illustrator
 Retsujou no Meikyou (2008) - Author & Illustrator
 Oshigoto no Jikan!? (2009) - Illustrator

References

External links 
 Personal website (Japanese)
 

Japanese artists
Living people
Manga artists from Hyōgo Prefecture
Year of birth missing (living people)